2-Methyl-alpha-PVP  (2-Me-PVP) is a substituted cathinone derivative with stimulant effects which has been sold as a designer drug. It was first identified in Sweden in 2021.

See also 
 2-Methylmethcathinone
 3F-PVP
 4-Cl-PVP
 4-Et-PVP
 Ortetamine

References 

Cathinones
Designer drugs
Norepinephrine-dopamine releasing agents
Pyrrolidinophenones